The FIBA 3x3 World Tour is an international tour of men's 3x3 basketball teams representing cities. The tournament is organized by FIBA. The FIBA 3x3 Pro Series and FIBA 3x3 Women Series were launched in 2019.

Qualification
The FIBA 3x3 Men's Pro Circuit refers to the system or network of FIBA-sanctioned men's 3x3 competitions for city-based professional teams. The pro circuit includes the FIBA 3x3 World Tour itself, as well as challenger and quest competitions which serves as World Tour qualifiers.

Finals results

Awards 
Most Valuable Player

Most Spectacular Player

Individual contests winners

Dunk contest 
2012 —  Rafał 'Lipek' Lipiński 
2013 —  Rafał 'Lipek' Lipiński 
2014 —  Rafał 'Lipek' Lipiński 
2015 —  Rafał 'Lipek' Lipiński 
2016 —  Vadym 'Miller' Piddubchenko 
2017 —  Rafał 'Lipek' Lipiński 
2018 —  Vadym 'Miller' Piddubchenko 
2022 —  Brandon Ruffin

Shoot-out contest 
2012 —  Angel Santana ( Bucharest UPB) 
2013 —  Fandi Andika Ramadhani ( Jakarta)
2014 —  Dejan Majstorović ( Novi Sad)
2015 —  Derek Griffin ( Denver) 
2016 —  Marcin Chudy ( Gdansk) 
2017 —  Steve Sir ( Saskatoon) 
2022 —  Arturs Strelnieks ( Riga)

References

External links 
 

 
3x3 basketball competitions
Recurring sporting events established in 2012
International club basketball competitions
Sports competition series